Cory Robert Paus (born April 4, 1980) is a former Canadian football quarterback in the Canadian Football League (CFL). He played college football at UCLA. He played one year in the CFL for the Calgary Stampeders.

His brother, Casey Paus, played quarterback at the University of Washington.

References

External links
UCLA Bruins bio
Just Sports Stats

1980 births
Living people
People from Hinsdale, Illinois
Players of American football from Illinois
Sportspeople from Cook County, Illinois
Sportspeople from DuPage County, Illinois
American football quarterbacks
Canadian football quarterbacks
UCLA Bruins football players
Calgary Stampeders players